Allensville is an unincorporated community in Richland Township, Vinton County, Ohio, in the United States.

History
Allensville was laid out in 1837, and named after William Allen, a state legislator.  The first post office in Allensville was established in 1839.

References

Unincorporated communities in Vinton County, Ohio
Unincorporated communities in Ohio